Senhaja de Srair ("Senhaja of Srair") is a Northern Berber language. It is spoken by the Sanhaja Berbers inhabiting the southern part of the Moroccan Rif. It is spoken in the Ketama area west of Tarifit in the Taza-Al Hoceima-Taounate region.

Despite its speech area, the Sanhaja language belongs to the Atlas branch of Berber. It has also been influenced by the neighbouring Riffian language.

Name of the language
Besides Senhaja de Srair, there are also serval names such as [Berber of] Senhaja Sraïr, Senhajiya, Shilha/Shelha (ššelḥa), Shilha n Jbala, Tajeblit, Tamazight n Jbala, Tasenhajit.>

Dialects
Dialects of Senhaja Berber are Beni Ahmed, Beni Bechir, Beni Buensar, Beni Jennus, Beni Mesdui, Beni Seddat, Quetama (Ketama), Sarcat, and Tagsut

Writing System 
Senhaja de Srair speakers are not used to write in their language. Unlike some other Berber languages, Tifinagh script is never used in Senhaja de Srair. If the language is written, especially in the case on Computer-mediated communication, Latin script is the most considered one, numbers are sometimes (but not consistently) used to represent some sounds:

Arabic influences 
Based on the Leipzig–Jakarta list, 17% vocabulary in Senhaja de Srair is borrowed. The Phonology of Senhaja de Srair is very similar as Arabic.

Consonants 
Following shows the oppositions in the consonantal system:

Vowels 
There are three peripheral vowels (a, i, u) and a central vowel, schwa [ə], written as e. The vowel a is usually realized as [æ], i as [ɪ], u as [u], schwa as [ə]. 

Following shows the Senhaja vowel system:

References

Bibliography

 Peter Behnstedt, "La frontera entre el bereber y el árabe en el Rif", Estudios de dialectología norteafricana y andalusí vol. 6, 2002.
 Esteban Ibañez, Diccionario español-senhayi (dialecto beraber de Senhaya de Srair), 1959.
 Mena Lafkiou, Atlas linguistique des variétés berbères du Rif (Berber Studies vol.15), 2007. 
 A. Renisio, Études sur les dialectes berbères des Beni Iznassen, du Rif et des Senhaja de Sraïr.  Grammaire, textes et lexique.  PIHEM, vol. 12.  Paris 1932.

Berber languages
Berbers in Morocco
Languages of Morocco
Rif